Rūdolfs Jurciņš (19 June 1909 – 22 July 1948) was a Latvian basketball player. He played as a center.

Career
Jurciņš won a gold medal at the 1935 EuroBasket competition, becoming first European champion. He participated at the 1936 Summer Olympics, where Latvia national basketball team got 15th/18th place.

Jurciņš started to play basketball at the age of 15 in 1924. Before that he played football. He studied in the University of Latvia but did not graduate. However he played for University basketball team Universitātes sports from 1930 until 1937. He was a six-time Latvian champion. His debut in Latvian national basketball team was in 1928. Overall, he played 23 games in the national team and was a team captain.

He was arrested in 1945 and deported to the GULAG camp in 1947. Rūdolfs Jurciņš died on 22 July 1948 in Molotov Oblast, Soviet Union.

References

External links 
 

1909 births
1948 deaths
Latvian men's basketball players
Olympic basketball players of Latvia
Basketball players at the 1936 Summer Olympics
FIBA EuroBasket-winning players
Basketball players from Riga
Latvian people who died in Soviet detention
People who died in the Gulag
Centers (basketball)